The 2010 All-England Super Series was a badminton tournament held in Birmingham, England, Great Britain from 9 March 2010 to 14 March 2010. It was the third competition in the BWF 2010 Super Series. It was held in the National Indoor Arena.

The draws were released on 23 February 2010.

Men's singles

Seeds
 Lee Chong Wei (Champion)
 Lin Dan
 Chen Jin
 Taufik Hidayat
 Peter Gade
 Bao Chunlai
 Nguyen Tien Minh
 Jan Ø. Jørgensen

Results

Women's singles

Seeds
 Wang Yihan
 Wang Lin
 Jiang Yanjiao
 Pi Hongyan
 Wang Xin
 Lu Lan
 Saina Nehwal
 Zhou Mi

Results

Men's doubles

Seeds
 Koo Kien Keat / Tan Boon Heong
 Jung Jae-sung / Lee Yong-dae
 Markis Kido / Hendra Setiawan
 Mathias Boe / Carsten Mogensen
 Cai Yun / Fu Haifeng
 Alvent Yulianto / Hendra Aprida Gunawan
 Guo Zhendong / Xu Chen
 Choong Tan Fook / Lee Wan Wah

Results

Women's doubles

Seeds
 Du Jing / Yu Yang
 Ma Jin / Wang Xiaoli
 Cheng Shu / Zhao Yunlei
 Chin Eei Hui / Wong Pei Tty
 Cheng Wen-hsing / Chien Yu-chin
 Miyuki Maeda / Satoko Suetsuna
 Ha Jung-eun / Lee Kyung-won
 Mizuki Fujii / Reika Kakiiwa

Results

Mixed doubles

Seeds
 Zheng Bo / Ma Jin
 Nova Widianto / Lilyana Natsir
 Lee Yong-dae / Lee Hyo-jung
 He Hanbin / Yu Yang
 Joachim Fischer Nielsen / Christinna Pedersen
 Tao Jiaming / Zhang Yawen
 Thomas Laybourn / Kamilla Rytter Juhl
 Hendra Aprida Gunawan / Vita Marissa

Results

References

External links
All England Super Series 2010 at tournamentsoftware.com

All England Open Badminton Championships
All England Super Series
All England
Sports competitions in Birmingham, West Midlands
March 2010 sports events in the United Kingdom